Pasiphila socotrensis  is a moth in the family Geometridae. It is found in Yemen (Socotra).

References

Moths described in 1994
socotrensis
Endemic fauna of Socotra